The Blackwater National Wildlife Refuge was established in 1933 as a waterfowl sanctuary for birds migrating along the critical migration highway called the Atlantic Flyway. Blackwater NWR is one of over 540 units in the National Wildlife Refuge System, which is managed by the United States Fish and Wildlife Service.

Blackwater Refuge is fed by the Blackwater River and the Little Blackwater River. The name "blackwater" comes from the tea-colored waters of the local rivers, which are darkened by the tannin that is picked up as the water drains through peat soil in the marshes.

Wildlife
In addition to a wealth of wetlands and forests, Blackwater Refuge is also host to over 250 bird species, 35 species of reptiles and amphibians, 165 species of threatened and endangered plants, and numerous mammals that can be spotted throughout the year in Blackwater's marshes, forests, meadows, and fields. During winter migration, Blackwater Refuge is also home to upwards of 15,000 geese and 10,000 ducks. The refuge is currently host to three recovered species: the formerly endangered Delmarva fox squirrel, the delisted migrant peregrine falcon, and the recently delisted American bald eagle.

Mammals

Blackwater Refuge is home to a variety of mammals, which until recently included the South American nutria. Introduced to the refuge in the 1930s, intensive trapping efforts starting in 2002 helped nearly eliminate the animal from the area. Among the mammals is also the Delmarva fox squirrel, considered a formerly endangered species. Blackwater forest management programs are working to protect this squirrel.

Mammals found at Blackwater National Wildlife Refuge include:

Reptiles and amphibians

The marshes and swamps of Blackwater provide an ideal living environment for a number of reptiles and amphibians.

Blackwater Refuge's reptiles include:

Blackwater Refuge's amphibians include:

Birds

Blackwater Refuge is a major feeding ground for migrating birds, most abundant being the Canada goose. Swans, cranes, and more than 20 species of duck can be found in its waters. Also of note is the bald eagle, another of the refuge's protected species. The refuge is home to one of the highest concentrations of nesting bald eagles on the Atlantic coast. In all, the refuge is a resting ground for over 200 varieties of bird.

Some of the more common birds to be spotted in Blackwater Refuge are:

Bald eagles

The most famous wildlife resident in the Blackwater Wildlife Refuge is the bald eagle. The refuge hosts the largest breeding population of bald eagles on the East Coast north of Florida, and during the winter, many eagles migrate to Blackwater Refuge from northern states and from Canada. The Friends of Blackwater website offers a live Eagle Cam that monitors an eagle nest on the refuge.

In addition, the Friends of Blackwater also offer a live Osprey Cam that follows the adventures of a nesting pair of ospreys through the spring and summer.

Visitor opportunities
Blackwater National Wildlife Refuge also offers a wealth of recreational and visitor opportunities for all age groups. Although much of Blackwater Refuge is composed of wetlands, there are still many ways to get close to the wildlife and to enjoy the scenery.

The refuge features a visitor center on Key Wallace Drive where visitors will find wildlife exhibits, an authentic eagle's nest, Eagle Cam and Osprey Cam TV monitors, the Eagle's Nest Book and Gift Shop, a butterfly garden, restrooms, and maps and brochures that will help visitors make the most of their visit. On the second floor of the Visitor Center is the "Wild Birds Unlimited Pathways to Nature Observatory," which features bird exhibits and spotting scopes for viewing the Blackwater River, the marsh, and the Osprey Cam platform. (The second floor is accessible via a staircase or a handicap-accessible elevator). The staff at the Visitor Center also offer educational programs for children, as well as frequent organized bird walks and an annual Eagle Festival. The center is open from 8am – 4pm, seven days a week except Thanksgiving and Christmas. Access to the refuge is from dawn till dusk.

Visitors can drive, bike, or walk the length of the Drive.

There is a daily permit fee of $3.00 for private vehicles (not including commercial vans or buses) and of $1.00 for pedestrians and bicyclists wishing to access the Wildlife Drive. There are also longer permits and passes available, including a variety of annual passes and a senior citizen pass.

In addition to the Visitor Center and Wildlife Drive, Blackwater Refuge offers three paddling trails, four hiking trails, and hunting, fishing, and crabbing opportunities. There are also other entrances to Blackwater Refuge, making it possible to drive through the refuge without having to take the Wildlife Drive.

About half of the refuge is designated the Harriet Tubman Underground Railroad National Monument. A portion of the area was transferred to the National Park Service in 2014 as the Harriet Tubman Underground Railroad National Historical Park.

Staff and volunteers
The Blackwater Refuge staff is supported by the Friends of Blackwater, which is a non-profit citizen support group that puts in many volunteer hours at the refuge and sponsors various programs and projects throughout the year. In 2003, the Friends of Blackwater were named the "Friends Group of the Year."

References

External links
 Blackwater National Wildlife Refuge – USFWS
 Friends of Blackwater
 
 Brochures – 

1933 establishments in Maryland
Marshes of Maryland
National Wildlife Refuges in Maryland
Protected areas established in 1933
Protected areas of Dorchester County, Maryland
Swamps of Maryland
Wetlands of Maryland
Landforms of Dorchester County, Maryland
Cambridge, Maryland